Hibbertia drummondii is a shrub in the family Dilleniaceae family and is endemic to Western Australia. It flowers from September to October and produces yellow flowers. The species was first described in 1849 by Nikolai Turczaninow in the Bulletin de la Société Impériale des Naturalistes de Moscou and given the name Ochrolasia drummondii. In 1893, Ernest Friedrich Gilg changed the name to Hibbertia drummondii in Die Natürlichen Pflanzenfamilien. The specific epithet (drummondii) honours James Drummond.

See also
List of Hibbertia species

References

drummondii
Flora of Western Australia
Plants described in 1863
Taxa named by Nikolai Turczaninow